The Hungarian method is a combinatorial optimization algorithm that solves the assignment problem in polynomial time and which anticipated later primal–dual methods. It was developed and published in 1955 by Harold Kuhn, who gave the name "Hungarian method" because the algorithm was largely based on the earlier works of two Hungarian mathematicians: Dénes Kőnig and Jenő Egerváry.

James Munkres reviewed the algorithm in 1957 and observed that it is (strongly) polynomial. Since then the algorithm has been known also as the Kuhn–Munkres algorithm or Munkres assignment algorithm. One of the most popular  variants is the Jonker–Volgenant algorithm. Ford and Fulkerson extended the method to general maximum flow problems in form of the Ford–Fulkerson algorithm. In 2006, it was discovered that Carl Gustav Jacobi had solved the assignment problem in the 19th century, and the solution had been published posthumously in 1890 in Latin.

The problem

Example 
In this simple example, there are three workers: Alice, Bob and Dora. One of them has to clean the bathroom, another sweep the floors and the third washes the windows, but they each demand different pay for the various tasks. The problem is to find the lowest-cost way to assign the jobs. The problem can be represented in a matrix of the costs of the workers doing the jobs. For example:
{| class="wikitable" style="text-align:center;"
! 
! Cleanbathroom
! Sweepfloors
! Wash windows
|-
! Alice
| $8
| $4
| $7
|-
! Bob
| $5
| $2
| $3
|-
! Dora
| $9
| $4
| $8
|}

The Hungarian method, when applied to the above table, would give the minimum cost: this is $15, achieved by having Alice clean the bathroom, Dora sweep the floors, and Bob wash the windows. This can be confirmed using brute force:
{| class="wikitable" style="text-align:center;"
! 
! Alice
! Bob
! Dora
|-
! Alice
| —
| $17
| $16
|-
! Bob
| $18
| —
| $18
|-
! Dora
| $15
| $16
| —
|} (the unassigned person washes the windows)

Matrix formulation 
In the matrix formulation, we are given a nonnegative n×n matrix, where the element in the i-th row and j-th column represents the cost of assigning the j-th job to the i-th worker. We have to find an assignment of the jobs to the workers, such that each job is assigned to one worker and each worker is assigned one job, such that the total cost of assignment is minimum.

This can be expressed as permuting the rows of a cost matrix C to minimize the trace of a matrix,

where P is a permutation matrix. (Equivalently, the columns can be permuted using CP.)

If the goal is to find the assignment that yields the maximum cost, the problem can be solved by negating the cost matrix C.

Bipartite graph formulation 
The algorithm can equivalently be described by formulating the problem using a bipartite graph. We have a complete bipartite graph  with  worker vertices and  job vertices, and the edges each have a nonnegative cost . We want to find a perfect matching with a minimum total cost.

The algorithm in terms of bipartite graphs
Let us call a function  a potential if  for each . The value of potential  is the sum of the potential over all vertices: .

The cost of each perfect matching is at least the value of each potential: the total cost of the matching is the sum of costs of all edges; the cost of each edge is at least the sum of potentials of its endpoints; since the matching is perfect, each vertex is an endpoint of exactly one edge; hence the total cost is at least the total potential.

The Hungarian method finds a perfect matching and a potential such that the matching cost equals the potential value. This proves that both of them are optimal. In fact, the Hungarian method finds a perfect matching of tight edges: an edge  is called tight for a potential  if .

In each step, either we modify  so that its value increases, or modify the orientation to obtain a matching with more edges. We are done if  is a perfect matching.

This can be computed by breadth-first search.

Thus the size of the corresponding matching increases by 1.

If  is empty, then let

The resulting  is still a potential, and although the graph  changes, it still contains  (see the next subsections). By the definition of  the set  of vertices reachable from  increases (note that the number of tight edges does not necessarily increase).

We repeat these steps until  is a perfect matching, in which case it gives a minimum cost assignment. The running time of this version of the method is :  is augmented  times, and in a phase where  is unchanged, there are at most  potential changes (since  increases every time).

Proof that the algorithm makes progress
We must show that as long as the matching is not of maximum possible size, the algorithm is always able to make progress — that is, to either increase the number of matched edges, or tighten at least one edge. It suffices to show that at least one of the following holds at every step:

  is of maximum possible size.
  contains an augmenting path.

If  is of maximum possible size, we are of course finished. If  then we have found a loose-tailed path and we are done.

Proof that adjusting the potential y leaves M unchanged
But then  contains two edges that share the vertex , contradicting the fact that  is a matching.

Proof that  remains a potential
To show that  remains a potential after being adjusted, it suffices to show that no edge has its total potential increased beyond its cost. Thus  remains a potential.

Matrix interpretation

Given  workers and tasks, the problem is written in the form of an × matrix

where a, b, c and d are workers who have to perform tasks 1, 2, 3 and 4. a1, a2, a3, and a4 denote the penalties incurred when worker "a" does task 1, 2, 3, and 4 respectively.

The problem is equivalent to assigning each worker a unique task such that the total penalty is minimized. Note that each task can only be worked on by one worker.

Step 1

For each row, its minimum element is subtracted from every element in that row. This causes all elements to have non-negative values. Therefore, an assignment with a total penalty of 0 is by definition a minimum assignment.

This also leads to at least one zero in each row. As such, a naive greedy algorithm can attempt to assign all workers a task with a penalty of zero. This is illustrated below.

The zeros above would be the assigned tasks.

Worst-case there are ! combinations to try, since multiple zeroes can appear in a row if multiple elements are the minimum. So at some point this naive algorithm should be short circuited.

Step 2

Sometimes it may turn out that the matrix at this stage cannot be used for assigning, as is the case for the matrix below.

To overcome this, we repeat the above procedure for all columns (i.e. the minimum element in each column is subtracted from all the elements in that column) and then check if an assignment with penalty 0 is possible.

In most situations this will give the result, but if it is still not possible then we need to keep going.

Step 3

All zeros in the matrix must be covered by marking as few rows and/or columns as possible. Steps 3 and 4 form one way to accomplish this.

For each row, try to assign an arbitrary zero. Assigned tasks are represented by starring a zero. Note that assignments can't be in the same row or column.
 We assign the first zero of Row 1. The second zero of Row 1 can't be assigned.
 We assign the first zero of Row 2. The second zero of Row 2 can't be assigned.
 Zeros on Row 3 and Row 4 can't be assigned, because they are on the same column as the zero assigned on Row 1.

We could end with another assignment if we choose another ordering of the rows and columns.

Step 4

Cover all columns containing a (starred) zero.

{|class="wikitable" style="text-align:center"
|- style="background: white"
|× ||× || || ||
|-
|style="background:lightgrey"| 0*||style="background:lightgrey"|a2|| 0 ||a4
|style="background: white"|
|-
|style="background:lightgrey"|b1||style="background:lightgrey"| 0*||b3|| 0 
|style="background: white"|
|-
|style="background:lightgrey"| 0 ||style="background:lightgrey"|c2||c3||c4
|style="background: white"|
|-
|style="background:lightgrey"| 0 ||style="background:lightgrey"|d2||d3||d4
|}

Find a non-covered zero and prime it. (If all zeroes are covered, skip to step 5.)

 If the zero is on the same row as a starred zero, cover the corresponding row, and uncover the column of the starred zero.
 Then, GOTO "Find a non-covered zero and prime it."
 Here, the second zero of Row 1 is uncovered. Because there is another zero starred on Row 1, we cover Row 1 and uncover Column 1.
 Then, the second zero of Row 2 is uncovered. We cover Row 2 and uncover Column 2.

{|class="wikitable" style="text-align:center"
|- style="background: white"
|| ||× || || ||
|- style="background:lightgrey"
| 0*||a2|| 0'||a4
|style="background: white"|×
|-
|b1||style="background:lightgrey"| 0*||b3|| 0 
|style="background: white"|
|-
|| 0 ||style="background:lightgrey"|c2||c3||c4
|style="background: white"|
|-
|| 0 ||style="background:lightgrey"|d2||d3||d4
|style="background: white"|
|}

{|class="wikitable" style="text-align:center"
|- style="background: white"
|| || || || ||
|- style="background:lightgrey"
| 0*||a2|| 0'||a4
|style="background: white"|×
|- style="background:lightgrey"
|b1|| 0*||b3|| 0'
|style="background: white"|×
|-
|| 0 ||c2||c3||c4
|style="background: white"|
|-
|| 0 ||d2||d3||d4
|style="background: white"|
|}

 Else the non-covered zero has no assigned zero on its row. We make a path starting from the zero by performing the following steps:
 Substep 1: Find a starred zero on the corresponding column. If there is one, go to Substep 2, else, stop.
 Substep 2: Find a primed zero on the corresponding row (there should always be one). Go to Substep 1.

The zero on Row 3 is uncovered. We add to the path the first zero of Row 1, then the second zero of Row 1, then we are done.
{|class="wikitable" style="text-align:center"
|- style="background: white"
|| || || || ||
|- style="background:lightgrey"
| 0* ||a2|| 0'  ||a4
|style="background: white"|×
|- style="background:lightgrey"
|b1|| 0*||b3|| 0'
|style="background: white"|×
|-
|| 0'   ||c2||c3||c4
|style="background: white"|
|-
|| 0 ||d2||d3||d4
|style="background: white"|
|}

(Else branch continued) For all zeros encountered during the path, star primed zeros and unstar starred zeros.
As the path begins and ends by a primed zero when swapping starred zeros, we have assigned one more zero.
{|class="wikitable" style="text-align:center"
|- 
| 0 ||a2|| 0*||a4
|- 
|b1|| 0*||b3|| 0
|-
|| 0*||c2||c3||c4
|-
|| 0 ||d2||d3||d4
|}

(Else branch continued) Unprime all primed zeroes and uncover all lines.
 Repeat the previous steps (continue looping until the above "skip to step 5" is reached).
 We cover columns 1, 2 and 3. The second zero on Row 2 is uncovered, so we cover Row 2 and uncover Column 2:
{|class="wikitable" style="text-align:center"
|- style="background: white"
||× || ||× || ||
|- 
|style="background:lightgrey"| 0 ||a2||style="background:lightgrey"| 0*||a4
|style="background: white"|
|- style="background:lightgrey"
|b1|| 0*||b3|| 0'
|style="background: white"|×
|-
|style="background:lightgrey"| 0*||c2||style="background:lightgrey"|c3||c4
|style="background: white"|
|-
|style="background:lightgrey"| 0 ||d2||style="background:lightgrey"|d3||d4
|style="background: white"|
|}
All zeros are now covered with a minimal number of rows and columns.

The aforementioned detailed description is just one way to draw the minimum number of lines to cover all the 0s. Other methods work as well.

Step 5

Find the lowest uncovered value. Subtract this from every unmarked element and add it to every element covered by two lines.

This is equivalent to subtracting a number from all rows which are not covered and adding the same number to all columns which are covered. These operations do not change optimal assignments. 

Repeat steps 4–5 until an assignment is possible; this is when the minimum number of lines used to cover all the 0s is equal to min(number of people, number of assignments), assuming dummy variables (usually the max cost) are used to fill in when the number of people is greater than the number of assignments.

If following this specific version of the algorithm, the starred zeros form the minimum assignment.

From Kőnig's theorem, the minimum number of lines (minimum Vertex cover) will be  (the size of maximum matching). Thus, when   lines are required, minimum cost assignment can be found by looking at only zeroes in the matrix.

Bibliography
 R.E. Burkard, M. Dell'Amico, S. Martello: Assignment Problems (Revised reprint). SIAM, Philadelphia (PA.) 2012. 
 M. Fischetti, "Lezioni di Ricerca Operativa", Edizioni Libreria Progetto Padova, Italia, 1995.
 R. Ahuja, T. Magnanti, J. Orlin, "Network Flows", Prentice Hall, 1993.
 S. Martello, "Jeno Egerváry: from the origins of the Hungarian algorithm to satellite communication". Central European Journal of Operational Research 18, 47–58, 2010

References

External links
 Bruff, Derek, The Assignment Problem and the Hungarian Method (matrix formalism).
 Mordecai J. Golin, Bipartite Matching and the Hungarian Method (bigraph formalism), Course Notes, Hong Kong University of Science and Technology.
Hungarian maximum matching algorithm (both formalisms), in Brilliant website.
 R. A. Pilgrim, Munkres' Assignment Algorithm. Modified for Rectangular Matrices, Course notes, Murray State University.
 Mike Dawes, The Optimal Assignment Problem, Course notes, University of Western Ontario.
 On Kuhn's Hungarian Method – A tribute from Hungary, András Frank, Egervary Research Group, Pazmany P. setany 1/C, H1117, Budapest, Hungary.
 Lecture: Fundamentals of Operations Research - Assignment Problem - Hungarian Algorithm, Prof. G. Srinivasan, Department of Management Studies, IIT Madras.
 Extension: Assignment sensitivity analysis (with O(n^4) time complexity), Liu, Shell.
 Solve any Assignment Problem online, provides a step by step explanation of the Hungarian Algorithm.

Implementations 
Note that not all of these satisfy the  time complexity, even if they claim so. Some may contain errors, implement the slower  algorithm, or have other inefficiencies. In the worst case, a code example linked from Wikipedia could later be modified to include exploit code. Verification and benchmarking is necessary when using such code examples from unknown authors.
Julia implementation
 C implementation claiming  time complexity
 Java implementation claiming  time complexity
 Python implementation
 Ruby implementation with unit tests
 C# implementation claiming  time complexity
 D implementation with unit tests (port of a Java version claiming )
 Online interactive implementation
 Serial and parallel implementations.
 Matlab and C
 Perl implementation
 C++ implementation
 C++ implementation claiming  time complexity (BSD style open source licensed)
 MATLAB implementation
 C implementation
 JavaScript implementation with unit tests (port of a Java version claiming  time complexity)
 Clue R package proposes an implementation, solve_LSAP
 Node.js implementation on GitHub
 Python implementation in scipy package

Matching (graph theory)
Combinatorial optimization